Sipalolasma ellioti is a species of spider of the genus Sipalolasma. It is endemic to Sri Lanka. The female is 11 mm in length.

See also 
 List of Barychelidae species

References

Endemic fauna of Sri Lanka
Barychelidae
Spiders of Asia
Spiders described in 1892